The 1933 season of the Primera División Peruana was the 18th season of top-flight Peruvian football. A total of 10 teams competed in this league. The national champions were Alianza Lima. First Division reduced to 9 teams for 1934. The team of Unión Carbone was promoted to next year.

Format 
 From 1931 until 1934 the results of a reserve teams league were added as bonus points.
 From 1931 until 1942 the points system was W:3, D:2, L:1, walkover:0.

Results

Standings

External links 
 Peru 1933 season at RSSSF
 Peruvian Football League News 

Peru1
Peruvian Primera División seasons
1933 in Peruvian football